Masters W55 javelin world record progression is the progression of world record improvements of the javelin throw W55 division of Masters athletics.  Records must be set in properly conducted, official competitions under the standing IAAF rules unless modified by World Masters Athletics.

The W55 division consists of female athletes who have reached the age of 55 but have not yet reached the age of 60, so exactly from their 55th birthday to the day before their 60th birthday. The W55 division throws a 500 g implement.

Key

References

Masters Athletics Javelin list

Masters athletics world record progressions
Javelin